The ITFA Best Lyricist Award is given by the state government as part of its annual International Tamil Film Awards for Tamil  (Kollywood) films.

The list
Here is a list of the award winners and the films for which they won.

See also

 Tamil cinema
 Cinema of India

References

Lyricist